The 1912–13 Ottawa Senators season was the 28th season of play of the Ottawa Hockey Club. Ottawa placed fifth and missed the playoffs.

Team business
In this season, the Ottawa Hockey Club became more commonly known as the 'Ottawa Senators'. The organization remained known as the Ottawa Hockey Association.

The lease of the Arena was held up over a dispute of the percentages. The Club wanted to continue at 70% of gate revenues, while Ted Dey, owner of the Arena, was demanding that the Club accept 60%.

Off-season
The league added two new teams in Toronto, the Torontos and the Tecumsehs. Former Ottawa player Bruce Ridpath became Toronto's first manager. The new teams recruited their own players and no players moved from other NHA teams to Toronto. However, the PCHA went after NHA players and Ottawa's Cyclone Taylor and Dubbie Kerr moved west to play in the PCHA. Taylor, who had been barred from joining the Senators by the Wanderers, became eligible to play for the Senators when the Wanderers dropped their interest in him, but he chose to move out west where he would remain for the rest of his life. Marty Walsh, who had become a part-time player in the 11–12 season, retired. Two new players joined the Senators lineup this season, Punch Broadbent and Clint Benedict, who would both play for Ottawa into the 1920s. Defenceman Horace Merrill, who had previously been a spare for the Senators, joined them full-time this season.

Regular season
Broadbent led the team with 20 goals in 20 games in his first season. Benedict would post his first shutout in the NHA on February 12, 1913, against the Tecumsehs.

Final standings

Results

‡ Played with rover (7 man hockey)

Goaltending averages

Scorers

Post-season Exhibition series
After the season a series was arranged between Ottawa and Montreal Wanderers and Quebec to play in New York. Ottawa and Montreal played first, with the winner to play-off against Quebec. After the Wanderers defeated Ottawa 10–8 (3–2, 7–6), the Wanderers won the two-game series against Quebec 12–10 (9–5, 3–5).

 Sources

See also
1912–13 NHA season

References

 

Ottawa Senators season
Ottawa Senators (original) seasons